Pihanga is a  andesitic volcanic peak in the North Island Volcanic Plateau, located to the north of Mount Tongariro, between Tongariro and Lake Taupo.  Lake Rotoaira lies to the south-west of Pihanga, and the smaller Lake Rotopounamu is situated on the south-western flank of the volcano, near Te Ponanga Saddle. Across the saddle to the west is the volcanic peak of Tihia. Pihanga and Lake Rotopounamu are part of the 5,129ha Pihanga Scenic Reserve, which in 1975 was added to the Tongariro National Park. Pihanga appears to have a large crater, but this is in fact the result of erosion, and the "crater" quickly narrows into a steep gorge.

Geology
Eruptions from Pihanga last occurred more than 20,000 years ago. The more recent eruptions are consistent with the north-north-east to south-south-west alignment of the present southern Taupo Volcanic Zone rifting. Just to the east is the Poutu Fault Zone.

Biology
Its slopes are covered in native bush and currently part of a major nature conservation project.

Maori mythology
In Maori mythology, Pīhanga was the female mountain whom Taranaki and Tongariro fought over, at a time when Taranaki was also located among the central North Island mountains.  Tongariro's victory resulted in Taranaki's banishment to the west coast, with his movement creating features such as the Whanganui and Pātea Rivers, and the Ngaere swamp.

The Keepers of the Wai
In Maori custom, the Pihanga Maunga became the responsibility of the Matapuna people (a mix of Tuwharetoa, Tama Kopiri/Upper Whanganui whanau/Tu Hope - Descendants of Te Rere Ao, the First of Tuwharetoa) of the Tuwharetoa people, who have traditionally been the keepers of the wai (Keepers of the Water) and Maunga Kaitiaki (Protectors of the Mountain).  The Pihanga mountain was an important water resource for the whole of the Tuwharetoa, Tainui, Whanganui and some parts of the East Coast rohe, are all catchments of this water source.

Some members of the chieftain line of the Matapuna people, who held mana, were given the honor of being buried on the mountain.  One such chief, Pakau, interred his son, who was killed in battle, in one of the burial caves. Pakau was known to have mourned for many months over the death of his son.

See also
 List of volcanoes in New Zealand

References

External links
 United Nations Environment Programme: Parks and Protected Areas: World Heritage Sites: Tongariro National Park
 Best, Elsdon. The Maori - Volume I, V Myth and Folk Lore. p205.
 Peter Thomson: Walks, GPS Tracks and many photographs: New Zealand: Rotopounamu

Volcanoes of Waikato
Tongariro Volcanic Centre
Ruapehu District
Taupō Volcanic Zone
Protected areas of Waikato